Akihisa (written: 明久, 明央, 昭久, 晃久 or 瑛久) is a masculine Japanese given name. Notable people with the name include:

, Japanese rower
, Japanese manga artist
, Japanese baseball player
, Japanese politician
, Japanese baseball player
, Japanese actor and model

Fictional characters
, a character in the light novel series Baka and Test

Japanese masculine given names